The following radio stations broadcast on AM frequency 1480 kHz: 1480 AM is a Regional broadcast frequency.

Argentina
 Radio Centro Dolores in Dolores, Buenos Aires.
 APP1480 in La Matanza, Buenos Aires.

Mexico
 XECARH-AM in Cardonal, Hidalgo
 XETKR-AM in Monterrey, Nuevo León, licensed in Guadalupe, Nuevo León
 XEVIC-AM in Ciudad Victoria, Tamaulipas
 XEZJ-AM in Guadalajara, Jalisco

United States

References

Lists of radio stations by frequency